Brodd is a Swedish surname. Notable people with the surname include:

Bruno Brodd, American javelin thrower
Eskil Brodd (1885–1969), Swedish diver
Monica Brodd (born 1973), Swedish beauty pageant contestant
Paulina Brodd (born 1994), Swedish model and beauty pageant winner
Yngve Brodd (1930–2016), Swedish footballer

Swedish-language surnames